Ivan Ivanov may refer to:

Sports
 Ivan Ivanov (archer), Bulgarian archer
 Ivan Ivanov (badminton) (born 1966), retired badminton player from Bulgaria
 Ivan Ivanov (cross-country skier) (born 1987), Russian cross-country skier
 Ivan Ivanov (cyclist) (born 1960), Soviet racing cyclist
 Ivan Ivanov (footballer, born 1942) (1942–2006), Bulgarian international footballer
 Ivan Ivanov (footballer, born 1983), Bulgarian footballer who plays for PFC Svetkavitsa
 Ivan Ivanov (footballer, born 1988), Bulgarian footballer who plays for FC Basel
 Ivan Ivanov (footballer, born 1989), Bulgarian football defender who plays for Akademik Sofia
 Ivan Ivanov (gymnast), Bulgarian gymnast
 Ivan Ivanov (long jumper) (born 1938), Bulgarian long jumper, see 1962 European Athletics Championships – Men's long jump
 Ivan Ivanov (runner) (born 1948), Soviet middle-distance runner
 Ivan Ivanov (shot putter) (born 1992), Kazakhstani shot putter
 Ivan Ivanov (speedway rider), Russian ice speedway rider, see 2010 Individual Ice Racing World Championship
 Ivan Ivanov (sport shooter) (born 1921), Bulgarian Olympic shooter
 Ivan Ivanov (swimmer) (born 1979), retired Kyrgyzstani swimmer
 Ivan Ivanov (triathlete) (born 1989), Ukrainian triathlete
 Ivan Ivanov (volleyball) (born 1950), Bulgarian volleyball player
 Ivan Ivanov (weightlifter) (born 1971), Olympic weightlifter for Bulgaria
 Ivan Ivanov (wrestler, born 1937) (1937–2010), Bulgarian Olympic wrestler
 Ivan Ivanov (wrestler, born 1968), Bulgarian Olympic wrestler
 Ivan Ivanov (wrestler, born 1986), Bulgarian Greco-Roman wrestler

Other
 Ivan Ivanov (mathematician) (1862–1939), Russian-Soviet mathematician
 Ivan Ivanov (mayor) (1891–1965), Bulgarian engineer and politician
 Ivan Ivanov Bagryanov (1891–1945), Bulgarian Prime Minister
 Ivan Ivanov-Vano (1900–1987), Soviet animator
 Ivan Ivanov (singer) (born 2000), Bulgarian child singer and songwriter
 Ivan Ivanov (actor), Bulgarian actor, see Bloodsport 4: The Dark Kumite
 Ivan Ivanov (diplomat), Ambassador of Russia to Afghanistan